The New Zealand cricket team toured Pakistan in November to December 2003 and played a five-match One Day International (ODI) series against the Pakistan cricket team. Pakistan won the series 5–0. New Zealand were captained by Chris Cairns and Pakistan by Inzamam-ul-Haq.

ODI series

1st ODI

2nd ODI

3rd ODI

4th ODI

5th ODI

References

External links
 CricInfo

2003 in New Zealand cricket
2003 in Pakistani cricket
International cricket competitions in 2003–04
New Zealand cricket tours of Pakistan
Pakistani cricket seasons from 2000–01